The Parliament of Malta is the constitutional legislative body in Malta, located in Valletta. The parliament is unicameral, with a democratically elected House of Representatives and the President of Malta. By constitutional law, all government ministers, including the Prime Minister, must be members of the House of Representatives.

Between 1921 and 1933 the Parliament was bicameral, consisting of a Senate (Senat) as well as a Legislative Assembly (Assemblea Leġiżlattiva).

House of Representatives of Malta
The House of Representatives is the unicameral legislature of Malta and a component of the Parliament of Malta. The House is presided over by the Speaker of the House. The President of Malta is appointed for a five-year term by a resolution of the House.

Composition
The House is composed of an odd number of members elected for one legislative term of five years. Ordinarily, five members are returned from each of thirteen electoral districts using the single transferable vote electoral system but additional members are elected in cases of dis-proportionality (where a party with an absolute majority of votes fails to win an absolute majority of seats and where only candidates from two parties are elected). Since 2022 up to 12 seats can be provided to unelected candidates from "the under-represented gender" in case one of both fails to make up to 40% of the elected members.

Meeting place
Between 1921 and 2015, the House of Representatives was housed in the Grandmaster's Palace in Valletta. Since 4 May 2015 the House of Representatives has met in the Parliament House, near the city gate of Valletta.

Committees
The Standing Orders of the House provide for the creation of eight Parliamentary Standing Committees to make parliamentary work more efficient and enhance Parliament's scrutiny functions.

The Standing Committees are:
Standing Committee on House Business
Standing Committee on Privileges
Standing Committee on Public Accounts
Standing Committee on Foreign and European Affairs
Standing Committee on Social Affairs
Standing Committee on Consideration of Bills
Standing Committee on Family Affairs
Standing Committee on Economic and Financial Affairs

Other Standing Committees constituted by other statutes include:
Standing Committee on Environment and Development Planning
National Audit Office Accounts Committee
Standing Committee for Public Appointments
Committee for Standards in Public Life

There are also select committees and non-official committees.

Latest elections

Members
List of members of the parliament of Malta, 2008–13
List of members of the parliament of Malta, 2013–17
List of members of the parliament of Malta, 2017–22
List of members of the parliament of Malta, 2022–27

References

External links
 

Malta
Government of Malta
Malta
Malta
Politics of Malta
1921 establishments in Malta